Jackson Park Historic District may refer to:

Jackson Park Historic District (Dubuque, Iowa)
Jackson Park Historic District (Nashville, Tennessee)